Improvisations is a jazz album recorded in 1956, in Paris, by Stéphane Grappelli (violin), Maurice Vander (piano), Pierre Michelot (double bass) and Baptist "Mac Kac" Reiles (drums).   It consists of mostly jazz standards.

Track listing 
"The Lady Is a Tramp" (Lorenz Hart, Richard Rodgers) – 3:05
"Fascinating Rhythm" (George Gershwin, Ira Gershwin) – 2:55
"Dans la Vie" (Louiguy) – 3:54
"Cheek to Cheek" (Irving Berlin) – 3:10
"A Nightingale Sang in Berkeley Square" (Maschwitz, Sherwin) – 3:11
"Taking a Chance on Love" (Duke, Fetter, Latouche) – 3:02
"'S Wonderful" (Gershwin, Gershwin) – 2:30
"Someone to Watch Over Me" (Gershwin, Gershwin) – 2:58
"If I Had You" (Campbell, Connelly, Shapiro) – 3:20
"Body and Soul" (Eyton, Green, Heyman, Sour) – 2:35
"I Want to Be Happy" (Caesar, Youmans) – 2:14
"She's Funny That Way" (Moret, Whiting) – 2:29
"Time After Time" (Cahn, Styne) – 2:44
"Just One of Those Things" (Cole Porter) – 2:30
"Slow en Ré Majeur" (Wilder) – 4:01
"Taking a Chance on Love" (Duke, Fetter, Latouche) – 3:01

References

Stéphane Grappelli albums
1957 albums
Mercury Records albums
Covers albums